Rafael  Darío Ramírez Carreño (born August 4, 1963) is a Venezuelan engineer, politician, and diplomat. He joined the board of Venezuelan state-owned petroleum company PDVSA in 2002 and served as company president from 2004 to 2014. He also served as Venezuela's Minister of Energy from 2002 to 2014. He was the longest-serving cabinet member under President Hugo Chávez. In 2014, he briefly served as Minister of Foreign Affairs, and then subsequently served as Venezuela's Permanent Representative to the United Nations in New York. Ramirez was fired as UN representative by Venezuelan president Nicolas Maduro the evening of November 28, 2017. He confirmed he had "resigned" at the request of Maduro on December 4, 2017

Life and career
Ramírez was appointed to lead the energy ministry in July 2002 by Venezuelan President Hugo Chávez. Ramirez had been the founding president of Venezuela's "Enagas", the national regulatory agency that was set up to be responsible for establishing the national plan for natural gas production and distribution. Ramírez, a mechanical engineer by his university education, has had wide-ranging experience in the design, development, coordination, and management of engineering projects for the Venezuelan petroleum industry.

Hence, Ramírez was responsible for the design, development, and promotion of  national policies for natural gas. Next, he was promoted to the status of Minister of Energy and Mines, and he faced the "oil sabotage" of late 2002 and early 2003. The Ministry of Energy and Mines became Ministry of Energy and Oil in January 2005, and became the Ministry for People's Power of Oil and Mining in 2012. On November 20, 2004, Ramírez was selected as the president of the company Petróleos de Venezuela, S.A. (PDVSA), a position that he has held concurrently with that of the Minister of Energy and Petroleum.

Ramírez was moved to the post of Minister of Foreign Affairs on 2 September 2014. After a few months he was instead appointed as Permanent Representative to the United Nations on 26 December 2014. His appointment as Permanent Representative coincided with Venezuela taking a seat on the United Nations Security Council on 1 January 2015. On 31 May 2017, Ramírez was elected as Chair of the Fourth Committee (Special Political and Decolonization). On November 28, 2017 after weeks of differences with Venezuela's government, Ramirez was fired as Venezuela's Permanent Representative to the United Nations in New York. After a week of silence from Ramirez and the Venezuelan UN Mission, on December 4, 2017 he confirmed that he had resigned from the UN post at the request of the Venezuelan president.

Professional career
 Mechanical engineer from Universidad de los Andes (ULA).
 Master's degree in energy from Universidad Central de Venezuela (UCV).

Sanctions
The Government of Canada sanctioned Ramírez in November 2017 as being someone who participated in "significant acts of corruption or who have been involved in serious violations of human rights".

He is also banned from entering neighboring Colombia. The Colombian government maintains a list of people banned from entering Colombia or subject to expulsion; as of January 2019, the list had 200 people with a "close relationship and support for the Nicolás Maduro regime".

See also
List of Ministers of Foreign Affairs of Venezuela
List of foreign ministers in 2014

References

External links 
 PDVSA.com Bio
 Venezuela's CITGO to Provide Cheap Gas for U.S. Hospitals, Nursing Homes and Schools
World Energy Magazine – Venezuela: A Factor for Energy Integration in Latin America and the Caribbean
http://www.guia.com.ve/noti/30003/rafael-ramirez-gana-mas-de-30000-dolares-al-mes Last known salary of Rafael Ramirez 

 

Living people
Central University of Venezuela alumni
Venezuelan engineers
Venezuelan defectors
Government ministers of Venezuela
1963 births
Permanent Representatives of Venezuela to the United Nations
Venezuelan Ministers of Foreign Affairs
People of the Crisis in Venezuela
Presidents of PDVSA